This page details the match results and statistics of the Namibia national football team from 2020 to present.

Results
Namibia's score is shown first in each case.

Notes

References

External links
Namibia » Fixtures & Results 2020 at worldfootball.net
Namibia » Fixtures & Results 2021 at worldfootball.net
Namibia – matches at Soccerway

Namibia national football team results
2020s in Namibia